The 2022–23 Florida Gators men's basketball team represented the University of Florida during the 2022–23 NCAA Division I men's basketball season. The team was led by first-year head coach Todd Golden, and played their home games at the O'Connell Center in Gainesville, Florida as a member of the Southeastern Conference. They finished the season 16–15, 9–9 in SEC Play to finish in eighth place. As the No. 8 seed in the SEC tournament, they lost in the second round to Mississippi State. They received an at-large bid to the National Invitation Tournament where they lost in the first round to UCF.

Previous season 
The Gators finished the 2021–22 season 20–14, 9–9 in SEC Play to finish a five-way tie for fifth place. As the No. 9 seed in the SEC tournament, they lost in the second round to Texas A&M. They received an at-large bid to the National Invitation Tournament where they defeated Iona in the first round before losing to Xavier.

On March 13, 2022, head coach Mike White left the school to take the head coaching position at Georgia. On March 18, the school named San Francisco head coach Todd Golden the team's new head coach.

Offseason

Departures

Incoming transfers

2022 recruiting class

2023 recruiting class

Roster

Schedule and results

|-
!colspan=12 style=""|Regular season

|-
!colspan=12 style=""|SEC tournament

|-
!colspan=12 style=""|NIT tournament

Source

Rankings

*AP does not release post-NCAA tournament rankings.

See also
2022–23 Florida Gators women's basketball team

References

Florida Gators men's basketball seasons
Florida Gators
Florida Gators men's basketball
Florida Gators men's basketball
Florida